Zuoxiao Zuzhou (born March 4, 1970 in Yancheng), real name Wu Hongjin,, is a Chinese musician and artist.

Zuoxiao Zuzhou is also a notable music producer. He has produced and arranged Chinese famous artist Ai Weiwei's first rock album The Divine Comedy. The soundtracks from the album are featured prominently in Ai Weiwei's documentary films.

Growing up, he founded the rock band No and was a member of the Beijing East Village art collective. He has also contributed to the Huayi Chinese Festival of Arts at the Esplanade, Singapore, and provided vocals for the song "A Walk in the Park" on Cowboy Junkies 2010 album Renmin Park. In 2008, he released the two-disc You Know Where the East Is.

The meaning of Wu Hongjin's stage name, Zuoxiao ( 左 "left", 小 "little")  Zuzhou (祖 "ancestor" ,  咒 "curse") reflects that everyone called him "unclear" or "unreliable" (没谱, méipǔ). or, that it is just for sound and has no meaning.

Early life and career

Early life 
His original name being Wu Hongjin, he grew up in a waterman family. He experienced usual life on the street when he was young. In 1993, he came to Beijing after living in Shanghai. He later established “Beijing East Village” along with some other artists in Eastern suburbs which had a far-reaching impact on Chinese contemporary art. During this time, he founded the band NO with Ye Qian, and later changed his name to Zuoxiao Zuzhou as the vocal, guitarist, violinist and composer for the group.

Early albums 
His first album, The Missing Master was distributed in 1998. The  second album Trip To The Temple Fair was distributed 2 years later. These two albums obtained the top album in the Rock magazine at that time. The third album, Zuoxiaozuzhou At Di'anmen won the Chinese music market, making him a very popular artist. In 1999, his work Increased To Famous Mountains One Meter was presented in the 48th Venice International Biennale which was collectively created by Zuoxiao Zuzhou and several other artists from Beijing East. After releasing The Missing Master and The Trip to Temple Fair he signed a contract with Modern Sky Music Company in 2004.

In 2005,  he self-published the album I can not sit sadly by your side. In 2007, The U.S.A, a film soundtrack album was released, sold  for $25 each, which set a new record in Chinese music album. In 2009, the double disc You Know Where The East Side Is was published, selling for $85 each, which makes it the most expensive album record.

On March 19, 2010, Zuoxiao Zuzhou held his first solo concert "All The Best" in Beijing Century Theatre. His entire lineup included bandmates Ai Weiwei, Ning Hao, Meng Jinghui, Jia Zhangke, Zhu Wen, Li Yanliang, and Fang Wuxing. The concert DVD version was released in March 2012.

You Know Where The East Is was awarded Southern Weekly annual culture original music in 2009. Big Deal has awarded nine nominations of Chinese Music Media Award in 2010, he obtained The Best Mandarin Male Singer, and Best Composer Award.

Controversy  
On August 12, 2009, Ai Weiwei was invited by the lawyer of Tan Zuoren up to the court in Chengdu, and Zuoxiao Zuzhou and others went to Sichuan together. In the early morning, Chengdu Police broke into door and hit Ai Weiwei on the head. Then, Ai was illegally detained till the end of the case to trial. The story was made into a documentary "Lao Ma Ti Hua", whom Zuoxiao Zuzhou was the main soundtrack producer. On June 6, 2011, after Ai was released by the authorities after illegal detention for 81 days, Zuoxiao Zuzhou begin to produce Ai’s rock album The Divine Comedy. The album was finished in 2013, and was published in the United States.

On April 24, 2011, when Zuoxiao Zuzhou as the grand finale artists who performed in ZhouZhuang folk poetry festival, some audience  members screamed the name of Ai Weiwei and on the background Weibo screen screened content related to Ai Weiwei. Thus, he has prohibited to participate in any commercial performance in China, including KAMA LOVE music festival in June.

On Sep 23, 2014, album We Need A Troublemaker was published. The same year, he participated in music festivals in Wuhan, Beijing, Shanghai, Shenzhen, Chengdu, Kunming, Changsha, Xiamen, Dali and Son on include Strawberry, Lebao music festival in succession which means his ban has been removed.

During Double Nine Festival 2012, The house of Zouzhou’s father-in-law was located in Qianjiatang, Wunjin District, Hangzhou had a forced demolition. The news triggered great attention in society;  many celebrities posted Weibo message to support including Li Chengpeng, Yao Chen, Li Kaifu, Han han, Hong Huang, Murong Xuecun, Han Zhiguo, Yu Jianrong, and Luo Yonghao. Zuoxiao Zuzhou went back home immediately to stop the demolition. Afterwards, Ling Guangyao, the secretary of Changzhou Wujin Hi-Tech Development District stated that before any negotiation with his family, the house will not be demolished. Moreover, the neighboring house also will not be demolished in order to avoid trouble. However, rumors on the internet about the famous nail household has never stopped.

Popularity growth 
In 2010, Zuzhou contributed music, lyrics and vocal in Cowboy Junkies’ song, "A Walk in The Park" in their album Renmin Park. In the same album, Cowboy Junkies covered Zuzhou’s song, "I Cannot Sit Sadly By Your Side". The band member Michael Timmins called Zuoxiao Zuzhou “China’s Leonard Cohen” in an interview with the National Public Radio.

In 2013, Zuzhou was invited to deliver a speech at the University of California, Berkeley, titled “China” in Zuoxiao Zuzhou’s Music and Art. Cowboy Junkies’ member Michael Timmins joined the event as the discussant.

In February 2014, German newspaper Süddeutsche Zeitung and Swiss newspaper Tages-Anzeiger carried a cover story about Zuoxiao Zuzhou. His photos was chosen by several famous magazine in China as their cover photos including GQ, ELLE MAN, Esquire, City Magazine and FHM magazine.

On February 28, 2015, Zuzhou performed PM2.5 in the animated session PM2.5’s Confession of Chai JIng’s documentary film Under the Dome. Hitting over 10 million views 24 hours after its release, the film successfully called for public attention to the air pollution in China before the National People’s Congress and the Chinese People’s Political Consultative Conference.

Discography
 The lost master 《走失的主人》1998
 Trip to temple fair 《庙会之旅》1999
 Zuoxiao Zuzhou at Di'anmen 《左小祖咒在地安门》 2001
 I cannot Sit Sadly by Your Side 《我不能悲伤地坐在你身旁》2005
 The USA《美国》2006
 You Know Where the East Is 《你知道东方在哪一边》2008
 Big deal 《大事》2009
 Zuoxiao Zuzhou OST For Ai Weiwei Works No.1 《左小祖咒原声配乐No.1》 2010
 Trip to temple fair II《庙会之旅II》2011
 You Know The Enemy Is Over There《你知道对方在那一边》2011
 Zuoxiao Zuzhou Head to Naizifang《左小祖咒去奶子房》2012
 Love for Life《最爱》2012
 I Never Tasted This Kind of Little Grape 《这小小的葡萄我从来没吃过》2013
 The Ideal City 《一座城池》2013
 We Need A Troubadour 《我们需要个歌手》2014
 2010-2013 Beijing Live 《2010-2013北京现场》2015
 I Have Never Eaten These Tiny Grapes Live 《这小小的葡萄我从来没吃过发布Live》2015
 Flore 《花神》 2016
 The Shanghai Days《上海岁月》2016
 Farewell Kanas《再见喀纳斯》2017
 Zuoxiao Zuzhou 2016 Xi'an Unplugged Live《左小祖咒2016西安不插电Live》2017
 The Soul and Flesh in Taipei《风月情色在台北》2017
 Never Sorry 《非常抱歉》2018
 Grapes Ripe 《葡萄熟了》2018
 The Artist In Artists 《艺术家中的艺术家》2018
 The lost master 20 anniversary 《走失的主人20周年》2018
 The Power of Belief is Endless 《相信的力量是无穷的》2018
 Chongqing Woman 《重庆女人》2018
 The Live of Three Nights in Ulanbator 《乌兰巴托的三个夜晚实况》2019

Art events and exhibitions
2017
Contemporary Chinese Works on Paper, Ipswich Art Gallery
Crystal - The Momentum of Contemporary Art, Museum Of Art Without Boundaries
2016
‘Art Farmer’ Personal painting Exhibition by Zuoxiao Zuzhou, One S, Shenzhen
Murakami Takashi & Zuoxiao Zuzhou ‘I Can't Look at Your Gigglish Face When I Sad’, D.House Life Hall, Xiamen
‘Wrong Version’ Personal painting Exhibition by Zuoxiao Zuzhou, Vision Hill Arts Center, Tianjin
2015
‘Their Nursery Rhyme’ Personal painting Exhibition by Zuoxiao Zuzhou, Ai Yike Art Gallery, Changsha
‘Tell Me That Story Again’ Personal painting Exhibition by Zuoxiao Zuzhou, Pipal Gallery, Guangzhou
‘Life Experience of Aesthetic’ The Momentum of Contemporary Art, Sichuan University of Culture and Arts
‘Cube Of Intuition’ Personal painting Exhibition by Zuoxiao Zuzhou, Cao Chang Di, Beijing, ARTASTE
‘A Beautiful New World’ International Contemporary Art Exhibition - The 2nd Nanjing International Art Festival, Nanjing International Exhibition Centre
Mortal Beings&Little Things - Zuoxiao Zuzhou's Small Paintings, No.55 Art Space, Beijing
Not On Site: Absolute Threshold and a Type of Site-Specific Drift, AMNUA, Nanjing
2014
‘Switch’, First Contemporary Art Exhibition of Xi'an, Xi'an Museum of Contemporary Art
‘Integration’, T-Museum Opening Exhibition, Hangzhou T-Museum, Zhejiang
2013 
Spectacle Reconstruction –Chinese Contemporary Art, MODEM Centre for Modern and Contemporary Arts, Hungary
Voice of the Unseen, Collateral event of the 55th International Art Exhibition - La Biennale Di Venezia
Walking with Pigs, Arthur M. Sackler Museum of Art and Archeology at Peking University
Individual Growth—the Momentum of Contemporary Art, Tianjin Art Museum, Shijiazhuang Art Museum
Fuck off 2, The Groninger Museum, the Netherlands
2012
‘Baptized - Art Under the Disaster’, CCD300 Contemporary Art and Design Center
‘Down to earth’, Contemporary Art Collection Exhibition in Guangxi, You Ming Tang Art Center of MIXC, Nanning
2011
‘Slap’, Invitation Exhibition of Young Artists, Beijing Sanlitun four five Art Center, China
‘Red Prescription’, Huangjueping Independent Image Art Space, Chongqing
‘Elite Exhibition of Contemporary Art’, Dalian Zhongshan Museum of Art
2010
‘Interconnected’, Three Shadows Art Documentary, Beijing Three Shadows Photography Art Centre, China
‘San Sheng Wan Wu’, Comprehensive Art Exhibition, Shanghai Zhengda Contemporary Art Exhibition Hall, China
‘Museum on Paper’, Art & Investment Magazine, Beijing, China
‘Get It Louder-Sharism’, Beijing Sanlitun Soho, Shanghai 800Show Creative Park, China
‘Transition’, Contemporary Art Exhibition, Wenzhou Seventh Art Center, China
‘Nature of China’, Contemporary Art Documentary, Suzhou True Color Museum, China
‘Arles in Beijing’, The First Annual Caochangdi PhotoSpring, China
‘The 4th China Independent Film Festival’, Institute of Drama and Film Studies, Nanjing University, China
‘Passing China’, Contemporary Chinese Photography, Gallery Sanstorium, Istanbul, Turkey.
‘3+X People And Things Around’, Contemporary Art Exhibition, China Art Archives and Warehouse, Beijing, China  
‘3+X/B Asks B Answers’, H.J.Y Contemporary Art Center, Beijing, China
‘3+X Can Be More Poetic’, Contemporary Art Exhibition, Nanjing Shangdong Contemporary Art, China
‘3+X’, Contemporary Art Exhibition, Arthur M. Sackler Museum of Art and Archeology at Peking University, China
‘Contemporary Artist Photo Exhibition’, Today Art Gallery, Beijing, China
‘You West, Me East’, Chinese Contemporary Art Exhibition, Chengdu K Gallery, China
‘You West, Me East’, Chinese Contemporary Art Exhibition, Shenzhen Art Museum, China
‘You West, Me East’, Chinese Contemporary Art Exhibition, Wuhan Art Museum, China
‘You West, Me East’, Chinese Contemporary Art Exhibition, Xi’an Art Museum, China
‘Dong Gallery New Art Show’, Dong Gallery, 798 Art District, Beijing, China
2009
‘New Art Revolution-Chinese Contemporary Art in Cuba’, National Museum of Fine Art, Havana, Cuba
‘Yan Gerber International Arts Festival(1st)’, Yan Gerber Museum of Modern Art, Weichang County, Hebei Province, China
‘Passing By China’, Contemporary Chinese Photography, Eli Klein Fine Art Gallery, New York, U.S
‘So Sorry’, Ai Weiwei, Haus der Kunst, Munich, Germany
‘Polar Region Tension’, Exhibition of Artists from Beijing, Shanghai and Chengdu, Qisheng Gallery, Luodai Town, China
‘China Imagery, City Flag’, Xi'an Qujiang International Contemporary Art Season, China
‘Zhi Dong Da Xi’, Yuangong＆Zuoxiao Zuzhou Exhibition, Shanghu Gallery, China
‘Fluid Community’, Constellations, The First Beijing 798 Biennale, China
‘Crap’, Chengdu Contemporary Art Exhibition, China
‘2nd Mary Inn Media Clippings, Art Meets Rock’ n Roll’, Yugong Yishan Club, Beijing, China
‘19 Games’, Chinese Contemporary Art Exhibition, T. Art Center, Beijing, China
‘13 No Kaos’, Duffy Cigar Art Gallery, Kunming, Yunnan, China
‘Reflection’-2009 New Art World Invitation Exhibition, Wall Art Museum, The Central Academy of Arts & Design, Beijing, China
‘Reflection’-2009 New Art World Invitation Exhibition, West Lake Gallery, Zhejiang, China
2008
‘Chinese Complex’, Contemporary Art Exhibition, Huamao Center, Beijing, China
Hypallage, the Post-Modern Mode Of Chinese Contemporary Art, The OCT Art & Design Gallery, Shenzhen, China
‘Maze II’, Asian Contemporary Art Center, Beijing, China
Palm Beach 3 Art Fair, Florida, U.S.
Art Basel Miami-China Art in the Beach, Florida, U.S.
‘You Know Where the East is’, Imperial City Art Museum, Beijing, China
‘Sky’ Famed Artists Gallery Show, Red Space Gallery, 798 Art District, Beijing, China
‘Academy and Non-Academy’ Gallery Show, Yibo Gallery, Shanghai, China
Art Exhibition, Chongqing Art Festival
Sculpture Show, Loft, 798 Art District, Beijing China, 
International Contemporary Art Exhibition, Shanghai Expo
Contemporary Art Exhibition, Beijing Expo, China
Art Exhibition, Yuangong Modern Art Gallery, Shanghai, China
2007
‘A Retrospective of Unnamed Art Group’, Shanghai Zendai Museum of Modern Art, China
Pingyao International Photography Festival, Shanxi, China
‘Convection’ Retrospective of Collections at Three Shadows Contemporary Photography Center, Beijing, China
‘I Love Contemporary Art Also’, Miao Feng Mountain, Beijing, China
2006
‘Seven’ Contemporary Art Exhibition, National Museum of Singapore
‘A Retrospective of Contemporary Photography’, at Season Gallery, 798 Art District, Beijing, China
‘Lianzhou International Photography Festival’, Guangdong, China
The 30th Hong Kong International Film Festival, Hong Kong
2005
‘The Amsterdam China Festival’, Amsterdam, Netherlands
‘Art Forum Berlin’, Alexander Ochs Galleries, Berlin
2004
‘What’ Art Exhibition, Shanxi Art Museum, China
2003
‘Crusoe-Exhibition of Contemporary Art’, Post-Modern City, Beijing, China
2002
Signboard, China Tour In Six Major Cities
2000
Mad Dog Crying Over Graveyard, Sonic Factory, Hong Kong
1999
48th Venice Biennale, Italy
1997                   
‘Methodology’, song based on Jiang Zemin’s report on the 15th NPC, China
1995  
‘Sound of Origin’ Behavioral Art at a Fly-over, Dongbianmen, Beijing
‘Add One Meter to Unnamed Mountain’, Behavioral Art, Miao Feng Mountain, Beijing
‘New Year’s Voice’, Maxim’s Restaurant at Chongwenmen, Beijing
1993  
Founded the avant-garde artists commune ‘East Village’ of Beijing, as one of the masterminds

Film scores
2018
 Hello Mr. Billionaire By Yan Fei/Peng Damo
2016
 Goodbye Mr. Loser By Yan Fei/Peng Damo
 Crosscurrent By Yang Chao
 The Wasted Times By Cheng Er
2013
 The Ideal City (Based on a Han Han Novel) 
2011
 Life Is A Miracle By Gu Changwei 
 Very Sorry By Ai Weiwei 
2010
 An Isolated Man By Ai Weiwei 
 Beautiful Life By Ai Weiwei 
 Hua Hao Yue Yuan By Ai Weiwei 
 San Hua By Ai Weiwei 
2009
 4851—May 12 Earthquake Student Victims List By Ai Weiwei 
 Old Mom Pettitoes By Ai Weiwei 
 Turtle's Road to Homeland By Dong Wensheng
2008      
 Stab Me By Liu Jian
2007        
 Fairy Tale By Ai Weiwei
 Tale of Stone By Dong Wensheng
 Seven Sages in Bamboo Forest By Yang Fudong
 Golden Week By Li Hongqi
 End Credit Music for Useless By Jia Zhangke
2005        
 Too Much Rice By Li Hongqi
 The World By Jia Zhangke
 On Darkness Does Not Exist (Play) By Zhu Xiuyang
2004        
 South of Cloud By Zhu Wen
 Ru Meng Ling By Jin Feng
2003        
 Channel Cave By Zhou Xiaohu
 Eat Drink Play Joy By Ai Dan & Ai Weiwei
2002        
 Mr. Honey By Zhou Xiaohu
2001        
 Beautiful Mushroom Cloud By Zhou Xiaohu
1995        
 Season of Taxi By Ma Yingli

Publications
 Mad dog barks at the tomb《狂犬吠墓》, 2001
 The Sad Boss 《忧伤的老板》 2010
 Zuoxiao Zuzhou Guitar Tabs《左小祖咒有谱》, 2011
 Mad dog barks at the tomb(second edition)《狂犬吠墓》（再版）, 2013
 Che Pi 《扯皮》 2017
 Che Pi II 《扯皮II》 2018

Works of art
‘Add One Meter to Unnamed Mountain’, Behavioral Art, Miao Feng Mountain, Beijing, 1995
‘Methodology’, song based on Jiang Zemin’s report on the 15th NPC, China 1997
‘I Love Contemporary Art Also’, Miao Feng Mountain, Beijing, China 2007

References

External links
 English Website
Bitetone Presents: Our 2011 Best 35 Chinese Records on Bitetone.com



1970 births
Living people
Central Academy of Fine Arts alumni
Chinese rock musicians
Musicians from Jiangsu
Chinese guitarists
Chinese violinists
Writers from Yancheng
Singers from Jiangsu
Chinese male singer-songwriters
Chinese male novelists
21st-century guitarists
21st-century violinists
21st-century Chinese male singers